Jana Novotná and Arantxa Sánchez Vicario were the defending champions but they competed with different partners that year, Novotná with Lindsay Davenport and Sánchez Vicario with Natasha Zvereva.

Davenport and Novotná lost in the third round to Sabine Appelmans and Miriam Oremans.

Sánchez Vicario and Zvereva won in the final 6–2, 6–3 against Appelmans and Oremans.

Seeds
Champion seeds are indicated in bold text while text in italics indicates the round in which those seeds were eliminated. All sixteen seeded teams received byes into the second round.

Draw

Finals

Top half

Section 1

Section 2

Bottom half

Section 3

Section 4

References

 1997 Lipton Championships Women's Doubles Draw

Women's Doubles
Doubles